The UAB Blazers college football team competes as part of the National Collegiate Athletic Association (NCAA) Division I Football Bowl Subdivision, and represents the University of Alabama at Birmingham (UAB) in the West Division of Conference USA (C-USA). Through the 2020 season, the Blazers played their home games at Legion Field in Birmingham, Alabama. The Blazers will open the new Protective Stadium, located on the grounds of the Birmingham–Jefferson Convention Complex, for the 2021 season. Since their inaugural 1991 season, the Blazers have played in 324 games, and entering the 2021 season, they have compiled an all-time record of 153 wins, 169 losses and 2 ties, and appeared in four bowl games. The Blazers qualified for a fifth bowl game in 2020, but that game was canceled amid COVID-19.

For the 1991–92 seasons, UAB competed as a Division III independent, unaffiliated with a conference. As a Division III school, the Blazers compiled an overall record of 11 wins, 6 losses, and 2 ties before moving up to Division I-AA for the 1993 season. As a Division I-AA independent for the 1993 through 1995 seasons, UAB compiled an overall record of 21 wins and 12 losses before they moved up to Division I-A. The Blazers entered the 1996 season as an I-A independent, and in their first I-A game, UAB lost to in-state rival Auburn 29–0. They finished their first I-A season with 5 wins and 6 losses. Already a participating member of Conference USA in other sports, on November 13, 1996, UAB was admitted to the league as a football playing member effective the 1999 season.

The longest tenured head coach of the Blazers was Watson Brown who led UAB for 12 seasons between 1995 and 2006. Brown coached the Blazers to their only bowl game in the 2004 Hawaii Bowl and led the team to an overall record of 62 wins and 74 losses before he resigned after the 2006 season. After Bill Clark led UAB to a record of six wins and six losses in his first season as head coach, on December 3, 2014, university president Ray Watts announced the elimination of the football program effective at the end of the 2014–15 season. However, due to major public outcry, followed by a significant fundraising drive, UAB announced within six months that the football program would be reinstated, with play restarting in 2017.

Seasons

Totals

Notes

References
General

Specific

 
UAB Blazers
UAB Blazers football seasons